The Thunder Radio Network provides radio play-by-play and coverage of Oklahoma City Thunder games to stations mostly located in the state of Oklahoma. The primary station is WWLS-FM 98.1 "The Sports Animal" in Oklahoma City; many of the affiliate stations also carry other WWLS programs.

Matt Pinto is the play-by-play announcer on the radio.

Affiliates

Outside of Oklahoma

Kansas

Spanish-language
One station provides coverage of Thunder home games in Spanish: WKY 930 in Oklahoma City. The Thunder broadcasts in Spanish feature play-by-play announcer Eleno Ornelas, also the Spanish-language voice of the Texas Rangers.

References

National Basketball Association on the radio
Oklahoma City Thunder
Sports radio networks in the United States